The Echinometridae are a family of sea urchins in the class Echinoidea.

Characteristics 
All Echinometridae  have imperforate tubercles and compound ambulacral plates.

Genera 
Anthocidaris A. Agassiz, 1863
Caenocentrotus H.L. Clark, 1912
Colobocentrotus Brandt, 1835
Echinometra Gray, 1825
Echinostrephus A. Agassiz, 1863
Evechinus Verrill, 1871
Heliocidaris L. Agassiz & Desor, 1846
Heterocentrotus Brandt, 1835
Selenechinus de Meijere, 1904
Zenocentrotus A.H. Clark, 1932

References